The 2005 Deutschland Tour was a men's road cycling stage race which took place from 26 to 29 August 2021. It was the 30th edition of the Deutschland Tour and part of the 2005 UCI ProTour.

Teams 
UCI Pro Tour Teams

Schedule

Stages

Stage 1 
 15 August 2005 – Altenburg to Plauen,

Stage 2 
 16 August 2005 – Pegnitz to Bodenmais,

Stage 3 
17 August 2005 – Bodenmais to Kufstein

Stage 4 
18 August 2005 – Kufstein – Sölden

Stage 5 
19 August 2005 – Sölden – Friedrichshafen

20-08-2005: Friedrichshafen-Singen, 175 km.

21-08-2005: Singen-Feldberg, 173 km.

22-08-2005: Ludwigshafen-Weinheim, 30 km. (ITT)

23-08-2005: Bad Kreuznach-Bonn, 170 km.

Final classification standings

General classification

Mountains classification

Points classification

Team classification

References

External links
Race website

2005
2005 UCI ProTour
2005 in German sport